Edmund Harris Lewis (August 30, 1884, Syracuse, Onondaga County, New York – July 31, 1972, Skaneateles, Onondaga County, New York) was an American lawyer and politician from New York. He was Chief Judge of the New York Court of Appeals from 1953 to 1954.

Life
He was the son of Ceylon H. Lewis.

He was a justice of the New York Supreme Court from 1930 to 1940, on the Appellate Division, Fourth Department from 1933 on.

In 1940, he was appointed a judge of the New York Court of Appeals to fill the vacancy caused by the resignation of Irving G. Hubbs. In November 1940, he was elected to a full 14-year term. On April 22, 1953, after the death of John T. Loughran, he was appointed Chief Judge of the Court of Appeals. In November 1953, he was elected on the Republican, Democratic and Liberal tickets to succeed himself, and remained on the bench until the end of 1954 when he reached the constitutional age limit of 70 years.

Sources
 Political Graveyard
 Obit in NYT on August 1, 1972 (subscription required)
 Listing of Court of Appeals judges, with portrait

1884 births
1972 deaths
Chief Judges of the New York Court of Appeals
New York Supreme Court Justices
Politicians from Syracuse, New York
People from Skaneateles, New York
Syracuse University College of Law alumni
20th-century American judges
Lawyers from Syracuse, New York
20th-century American lawyers